National Route 59 is a national highway in South Korea connects Gwangyang to Yangyang County. It established on 1 July 1996.

Main stopovers
 South Jeolla Province
 Gwangyang
 South Gyeongsang Province
 Hadong County - Sancheong County - Geochang County - Hapcheon County - Geochang County - Hapcheon County
 North Gyeongsang Province
 Seongju County - Gimcheon - Gumi - Sangju - Uiseong County - Yecheon County - Mungyeong
 North Chungcheong Province
 Damyang County
 Gangwon Province
 Yeongwol County - Jeongseon County - Pyeongchang County - Gangneung - Yangyang County

Major intersections

 (■): Motorway
IS: Intersection, IC: Interchange

South Jeolla Province

South Gyeongsang Province

North Gyeongsang Province

North Chungcheong Province

Gangwon Province

References

59
Roads in South Jeolla
Roads in South Gyeongsang
Roads in North Gyeongsang
Roads in North Chungcheong
Roads in Gangwon